Rendi Irwan Saputra (born 26 April 1987) is an Indonesian professional footballer who plays as a midfielder for Liga 2 club Deltras. His cousin, Uston Nawawi, is also a football player.

International career 
He made his debut for Indonesia in 2014 FIFA World Cup qualification against Bahrain on 29 February 2012.

Career statistics

International

Honours

Club
Persebaya Surabaya
 Liga Primer Indonesia: 2011
 Malaysia-Indonesia Unity Cup: 2011
 Indonesia Premier League runner-up: 2011–12
 Liga 2: 2017
 Liga 1 runner-up: 2019
 Indonesia President's Cup runner-up: 2019
 East Java Governor Cup: 2020

References

External links
 
 

1987 births
Living people
People from Sidoarjo Regency
Indonesian footballers
Liga 1 (Indonesia) players
Gresik United players
Deltras F.C. players
Mitra Kukar players
Persebaya Surabaya players
Persik Kediri players
Persija Jakarta players
Indonesia international footballers
Association football midfielders
Sportspeople from East Java